Lindsayomyrtus is a monotypic genus in the family Myrtaceae, containling the single species Lindsayomyrtus racemoides, commonly known as Daintree penda. These large trees grow naturally in the rainforests of the Wet Tropics of Queensland in Australia, the Moluccas, New Guinea and New Britain.

References 

Flora of Queensland
Trees of New Guinea
Trees of the Maluku Islands
Trees of Australia
Myrtales of Australia
Monotypic Myrtales genera
Myrtaceae
Australasian realm flora